Jeff Bilyk (born May 7, 1977 in Bayport, New York) is a retired American soccer player who spent three years in Major League Soccer. He is currently the academy director for the Charlotte Independence.

Player
Bilyk attended Clemson University, playing on the men's soccer team from 1995 to 1999.  In February 1999, the Columbus Crew selected Bilyk in the second round (eighteenth overall) of the 1999 MLS College Draft.  The Crew waived him on April 2, 1999.  He then signed with the Miami Fusion where he played from 1999 to 2001.  In 1999, he played eleven games on loan to MLS Pro 40 and in 2000, he played three games on loan to Pro 40.  In 2002, he played for the Milwaukee Rampage as the Rampage won the USL A-League championship.  He played as a midfielder for USL First Division side Virginia Beach Mariners from 2003 to 2006.  On April 18, 2007, the Hampton Roads Piranhas signed Bilyk.  Injuries kept him from playing.  On March 24, 2008, he joined the Charlotte Eagles of the USL Second Division.

Coach
From 2007 to 2009, Bilyk served as an assistant coach with Davidson College. Bilyk joined the staff off the Appalachian State Mountaineers men's soccer team in 2012, and was promoted to associate head coach in 2015.

References

External links
 CNNSI: Jeff Bilyk

1977 births
Living people
American soccer coaches
American soccer players
Clemson Tigers men's soccer players
Major League Soccer players
Miami Fusion players
Milwaukee Rampage players
Virginia Beach Mariners players
Charlotte Eagles players
USL First Division players
USL Second Division players
Virginia Beach Piranhas players
A-League (1995–2004) players
MLS Pro-40 players
Soccer players from New York (state)
Columbus Crew draft picks
People from Bayport, New York
Association football midfielders
Davidson Wildcats men's soccer coaches
Appalachian State Mountaineers men's soccer coaches
Sportspeople from Suffolk County, New York